The Bayer designation γ Octantis (gamma Octantis, γ Oct) is shared by three stars, in the constellation Octans, all yellow giants:
γ1 Octantis, HR 9032 or HD 223647
γ2 Octantis, HR 9061 or HD 224362
γ3 Octantis, HR 30 or HD 636

Octantis, Gamma
Octans